The Sheep (Italian:La pecorella) is a 1920 Italian silent film directed by Pio Vanzi and starring Carmen Boni.

Cast
 Carmen Boni 
 Ignazio Lupi 
 Manlio Mannozzi 
 Eugenio Musso 
 Fernanda Negri Pouget

References

Bibliography
 Stewart, John. Italian film: a who's who. McFarland, 1994.

External links

1920 films
1920s Italian-language films
Italian silent feature films
Italian black-and-white films